The Xplore M98 is a Palm OS-powered clamshell smartphone created by Group Sense PDA.

As of July 2008, it was still available for sale in Hong Kong from retailers.

Specifications

See also
Brighthand Photo Tour - GSPDA Xplore M28, M68 and M98
GSL Xplore M98 Product Info Page
Mobile Phone Accessories
Review By The Inquirer

Smartphones
Group Sense PDA mobile phones